The 1955–56 Scottish Division One was won by Rangers by six points over nearest rival Aberdeen. Clyde and Stirling Albion finished 17th and 18th respectively and were relegated to the 1956–57 Scottish Division Two.

League reconstruction
Following league reconstruction, League Division One (known until then as Division A) was expanded from 16 to 18 teams this season with Airdrieonians and Dunfermline Athletic being promoted from the previous season with all Division A teams staying up.

League table

Results

References

Scottish Football Archive

1955–56 Scottish Football League
Scottish Division One seasons
Scot